Zemgus Girgensons (born 5 January 1994) is a Latvian professional ice hockey centre and alternate captain for the Buffalo Sabres of the National Hockey League (NHL). Nicknamed "the Latvian Locomotive", he was selected 14th overall in the 2012 NHL Entry Draft by the Sabres. With this selection, Girgensons became the highest-drafted Latvian in NHL history, 16 spots higher than previous highest selection, Sandis Ozoliņš, in 1991. In the previous year, Girgensons was selected in the second round, 28th overall, in the 2011 KHL Junior Draft by CSKA Moscow. Girgensons was voted to the NHL All-Star Game in 2015.

Playing career
Girgensons began playing hockey in EVHS hockey school and was coached by former Dinamo Rīga player Edmunds Vasiļjevs. He played in Latvian minor and youth leagues.

Junior
In 2009, Girgensons moved to North America and played in the Eastern Junior Hockey League (EJHL) for the Green Mountain Glades. The next season, he moved to the United States Hockey League (USHL) and played for the Dubuque Fighting Saints. In 2011, he became a USHL champion with the Fighting Saints, and he also participated in the USHL All-Star Game. In the 2011–12 season, his last as a junior, Girgensons was named as the captain of the Fighting Saints.

Professional
Girgensons entered his draft eligibility year as a projected first-round draft pick. He was selected by the Buffalo Sabres in the first round, 14th overall. The Sabres had already used their own first-round pick, selecting Mikhail Grigorenko 12th overall, but traded a first-round (21st overall) pick (from Nashville), which Calgary used to select Mark Jankowski, and a second-round (42nd overall) pick, to move up seven spots to draft Girgensons. Before attending the Sabres' prospects' summer camp, Girgensons had committed to going to the University of Vermont Catamounts of the NCAA; however, he signed a professional contract with the Sabres on 13 July 2012, which forfeited his NCAA eligibility.

Girgensons began the 2012–13 season in the American Hockey League (AHL) with the Rochester Americans. He had a slow start to the season and, at the beginning of 2013, he suffered an injury from a late hit by Richard Pánik of the Syracuse Crunch. However, he finished the season strongly, scoring three goals in the Americans' first-round defeat in the Calder Cup playoffs.

After scoring three goals and adding one assist in five preseason games, Girgensons began the 2013–14 season in the NHL with the Sabres. He scored his first career NHL goal in the Sabres' season opener against Jimmy Howard of the Detroit Red Wings on 2 October 2013.

Girgensons was the runaway leader in fan voting for the 2015 All-Star Game, buoyed in large part by votes from his native Latvia.

On 1 September 2016, Girgensons, as a restricted free agent re-signed with the Sabres, agreeing to a one-year, $1.15 million contract extension. The following season, on 17 August 2017, Girgensons re-signed with the Sabres again, agreeing to a two-year contract worth $3.2 million 

On 5 July 2019, Girgensons signed a one-year, $1.6 million contract extension with the Sabres. He posted 12 goals during the 2019–20 season, the second-highest goal total of his career and enjoyed success playing alongside Johan Larsson and Kyle Okposo, a line dubbed "The Roarin' 20's" by fans due to the trio's jersey numbers. On 8 October 2020, Girgensons opted to forgo free agency and signed a three-year, $6.6 million contract extension with the Sabres.

On 4 January 2021, a day before his 27th birthday, Girgensons sustained a lower-body injury during a training camp scrimmage ahead of the 2020–21 NHL season and had to be helped off the ice. It was revealed on January 6 that he suffered a hamstring injury and had undergone successful surgery to correct it. It effectively ruled him out for the season.

Prior to the start of the 2021–22 season, the Sabres named Girgensons one of two alternate captains, along with Kyle Okposo, as Jack Eichel was stripped of the captaincy prior to the season due to injury.

International play
Girgensons participated at the 2012 World Junior Ice Hockey Championships as a member of the Latvian junior team and at the 2010 IIHF World U18 Championships. He made his senior national team debut in 2013 World Championships against the United States and scored his first international goal against Slovakia. He also was suspended for one game for spearing Branislav Mezei in the first period of the match in retaliation for an earlier hit.

On 7 January 2014, it was announced that Latvia Head Coach Ted Nolan had included Girgensons on his national team roster for the 2014 Winter Olympics in Sochi. Girgensons scored his first Olympic goal in Latvia's third tournament game, coming versus Sweden off of a power play goal against Henrik Lundqvist.

Zemgus Girgensons has played for team Latvia in the 2013 IIHF World Championship, 2014 IIHF World Championship, 2016 IIHF World Championship and 2017 IIHF World Championship.

Personal life
Girgensons comes from an ice hockey family. His father, Aldis Girgensons, played defence for Dinamo Riga.

His father is the general manager of East Hokkaido Cranes of the Asia League Ice Hockey and led the team to victory in the All-Japan Championship in December 2020.

Girgensons and his wife have two children.

Career statistics

Regular season and playoffs

International

Awards and honours

References

External links

 
 Profile on Fighting Saints website

1994 births
Living people
Buffalo Sabres draft picks
Buffalo Sabres players
Dubuque Fighting Saints players
Ice hockey people from Riga
Ice hockey players at the 2014 Winter Olympics
Latvian expatriate sportspeople in the United States
Latvian ice hockey centres
National Hockey League All-Stars
National Hockey League first-round draft picks
Olympic ice hockey players of Latvia
Rochester Americans players